Oteckovia is a Slovak family comedy-drama television series based on the 2014 Argentine soap opera Señores Papis. The series is directed by Vladmir Fishcer, Adriana Totikova and Peter Minarcin, and produced by Michal Krajčík, Helena Mindeková, Nikol Šmátralová, Ivica Dubovska, Alexandra Dubovská and Ján Diepers. The plot concerns four fathers struggling to manage their family, children and estranged wives. The fathers must keep up with what is typically women's work and household activities. Minor roles consist of a pair of teenagers, platonic friends Luky and Nina—opposite their love interests Dominik and Dorka. The two pairs meet with romantic obstacles and distrust. Oteckovia has gained 508,000 Slovak viewers; among them, 313,000 are young viewers with a market share of 41.7%. The series has aired since January 1, 2018 on TV Markíza.

Synopsis
Four fathers—Marek, Vladimir, Tomáš and Alexander—work different jobs and end up leaving their estranged wives, leaving them to raise their children collectively. They must keep up with the duties of maintaining a household. The fathers face relationship difficulties with their wives, children, or both. Luky and childhood friend Nina experience romantic attraction to their classmates, Dorta and Dominik respectively. The pair meet with frustration, including spending romantic periods due to infidelity. The two boys and girls face interpersonal conflict while maintaining their friendship.

Cast and characters
  as Marek Bobula
  as Vladimir Bielik
  as MVDr. Tomas Oravec
  as JUDr as Alexander "Alex" Becker – a businessman
 Karina Qayumová as Nina Bobulova
 Izabela Gavorníková as Viktória, "Viky" Bobulová
 Patrik Kučera as Marek "Marecek" Bobula
  as Lukáš "Luky" Bielik
 Jakub Horák as Filip "Fifo", "Fifko" Bielik
 Maroš Baňas as Jakub "Kubo" Bielik
 Tobias Král as Maximilian, "Max", "Maxo", Alexander Drobný – Alex and Sisa's son
 Laura Gavaldová as Júlia, "Julka" Oravcová
  as Linda Mackova (1st–3rd season) –  Tomáš' girlfriend who later abandoned him and began a relationship with Jaroslav
 Eva Pavlíková as MUDr. Marika Vágnerová – Julia's grandmother and Tomáš's mother-in-law (1st season)
 Monika Hilmerová as Lucia Bobulova Bielikova
 Zuzana Mauréry as Tamara Makova Bobulova
  as Petra "Zajko" Horváthová (1st, 2nd, and 6th season)
 Dominika Kavaschová as Silva "Sisa" Dorbná – Max's mother and Alex's wife
  as Simona, Strašiftáková (1st−5th season)
  as Dorota "Dorka" Šìpkoviá – Luky's girlfriend
  as Dominik – Nina's boyfriend (from 3rd season)
  as JUDr Ema Horváthová – Ondra's wife, but still loves Alex
 Marián Mitaš as Jaroslav, "Jaro" Szabo – Linda ex-fiancé

Series overview

Awards and nominations

References

External links
 

2018 Slovak television series debuts
Slovak comedy television series
Romance television series
Television episodes about infidelity
Television series about families
Television series about children
Television episodes set in schools
Television series about teenagers
Markíza original programming